The Urcos District is one of the twelve districts in the Quispicanchi Province in Peru. Created on January 2, 1857, its capital is the town of Urcos.

Geography 
The most important river of the district is the Willkanuta which crosses the district from south-east to north-west. A lake named Quyllur Urmana lies in the west of the town at the foot of Wiraqucha.

Other mountains are listed below:

Ethnic groups 
The people in the district are mainly indigenous citizens of Quechua descent. Quechua is the language which the majority of the population (54.58%) learnt to speak in childhood, 45.03% of the residents started speaking using the Spanish language (2007 Peru Census).

References 

  Instituto Nacional de Estadística e Informática. Departamento Cusco. Retrieved on November 1, 2007.

1857 establishments in Peru